Lake Harris is an endorheic salt lake in the Australian state of South Australia to the north of the Eyre Peninsula located about  northwest of the state capital of Adelaide within the gazetted localities of Lake Harris and Wilgena.
 
Lake Harris was named by the Government of South Australia after the surveyor, Charles Hope Harris, who discovered and mapped it in 1874.

The lake bed contains a dune field of gypsum sands which vegetated with both “low samphire shrubland and tall shrubland with a chenopod shrub understorey.”

Lake Harris along with the nearby lakes of Everard and Gairdner, form the extent of the protected area known as the Lake Gairdner National Park.

See also

Harris Lake (disambiguation)
 List of lakes of South Australia

Citations and references
Citations

References

Endorheic lakes of Australia
Saline lakes of South Australia
Lake Harris
Gawler bioregion